Dennis Ward Galehouse (December 7, 1911 – December 12, 1998) was an American Major League Baseball pitcher with the Cleveland Indians, Boston Red Sox and the St. Louis Browns between 1934 and 1949. Galehouse batted and threw right-handed.

Early life
Galehouse was born in Marshallville, Ohio, and grew up in nearby Doylestown. He played semipro baseball in Doylestown. He was 18 years old in 1930 when he entered professional baseball with the Johnstown Johnnies of the Middle Atlantic League. Between 1931 and 1934, he registered double-digit wins, earning a promotion to the major leagues in 1934.

Career

Galehouse made his major league debut with the Cleveland Indians in 1934, but he did not become a regular pitcher until 1936. He remained in Cleveland through the 1938 season. His best seasons came in the 1940s with the St. Louis Browns and Boston Red Sox; he won either 11 or 12 games four times during those years. He missed the 1945 season due to service in World War II. Galehouse led the American League in fewest bases on balls allowed per nine innings pitched (2.482) in 1947, and finished fifth in shutouts in the American League (with three) that season.

In 15 seasons, Galehouse had a 109–118 win–loss record, pitched 375 games (258 starts), 100 complete games, 17 shutouts, 13 saves, 851 strikeouts, and a 3.97 ERA.

Galehouse started a one-game, winner-take-all playoff for the Red Sox against Cleveland on October 4, 1948 to determine who would win the AL pennant. The Sox lost that game, 8-3, and Cleveland went on to win the World Series that year.

Later life
Galehouse remained in baseball after his playing career as a scout for both the Red Sox and Indians, as well as the Detroit Tigers, St. Louis Cardinals and San Diego Padres. He died in Doylestown at the age of 87.

References

External links
 Interview with baseball player Denny Galehouse (sound recording) by Eugene C. Murdock on Nov. 18, 1974, in Doylestown, Ohio (90 min.). Available on Cleveland Public Library's Digital Gallery.
 

1911 births
1998 deaths
Baseball players from Ohio
Major League Baseball pitchers
Cleveland Indians players
Boston Red Sox players
St. Louis Browns players
People from Marshallville, Ohio
Johnstown Johnnies players
Fort Wayne Chiefs players
New Orleans Pelicans (baseball) players
Minneapolis Millers (baseball) players
Seattle Rainiers players
Boston Red Sox scouts
Cleveland Indians scouts
Detroit Tigers scouts
St. Louis Cardinals scouts
San Diego Padres scouts
People from Doylestown, Ohio